The American Journal of Applied Sciences is a monthly peer-reviewed open access academic journal publishing original research articles in the fields of chemistry, business and economics, physics, geology, engineering, mathematics, statistics, and computer science. The journal was established in 2004 and is published by Science Publications, a publisher listed on Beall's List before it closed down in 2017.

The journal was abstracted and indexed in Scopus and Inspec. Scopus discontinued its coverage in 2016.

References

External links 
 

Publications established in 2004
Multidisciplinary academic journals
Open access journals